Esmail Kandi may refer to various places in Iran:

Ardabil Province
 Esmail Kandi, Ardabil
 Esmail Kandi, Germi, Ardabil Province
 Esmail Kandi 1, Parsabad County, Ardabil Province
 Esmail Kandi 2, Parsabad County, Ardabil Province

West Azerbaijan Province
 Esmail Kandi, Chaypareh, a village in Chaypareh County
 Esmail Kandi, Khoy, a village in Khoy County
 Esmail Kandi, Miandoab, a village in Miandoab County
 Esmail Kandi, Baruq, a village in Miandoab County
 Esmail Kandi, Poldasht, a village in Poldasht County